Greek protests may refer to:
 Anti-austerity movement in Greece, a series of demonstrations and general strikes sparked by plans to cut public spending and raise taxes
 Athens Polytechnic uprising, a massive 1973 demonstration of popular rejection of the Greek military junta of 1967–1974
 2008 Greek riots, large protests and demonstrations that escalated to widespread rioting, starting in Athens and spread to other cities
 2021 Greek protests, demonstrations in response to a proposed government bill that would allow police presence on university campuses, without the approval of the university's council or as a response to a felony, for the first time in decades
 2023 Tempi train crash protest